KJAB-FM (88.3 FM) is a radio station broadcasting a Southern Gospel/Bluegrass Gospel format. Licensed to Mexico, Missouri, United States.  The station is currently owned by Soul's Harbor Baptist Church dba Mexico Educational Broadcasting Foundation.    KJAB is a non-commercial station broadcasting the Gospel message and informative programming.

References

External links

JAB-FM
Southern Gospel radio stations in the United States